Paul Mecurio (born Paul Mercurio) is a comedian, actor, writer and producer. Mecurio has dozens of TV and film appearances and has won an Emmy Award and a Peabody Award. A lawyer by education, Mecurio worked as an investment banker and mergers and acquisitions lawyer before he turned to stand-up comedy full time.

Early Life and Career
Mecurio was born and raised in Providence, Rhode Island. As a youngster he worked at his mother's furniture store with his two siblings.

Mecurio graduated from the Providence College and, graduated from Georgetown University Law Center in Washington, D.C. He started his career on Wall Street, New York City as a mergers and acquisitions lawyer at Willkie Farr & Gallagher, and later as an investment banker at Credit Suisse First Boston.

While working on Wall Street, Mecurio attended a private stand-up comedy show by comedian Jay Leno. Mecurio, a comedy fan who had written some jokes for himself, handed 15 pages of his own material to Leno in hope of selling some for him to use on television. Leno contacted him and asked for more; Mecurio was paid $50 for his first joke which Leno used on the show.

Mecurio became a self-described "addict" to performing stand-up comedy. Shortly after doing stand-up as hobby while still on Wall Street Mecurio's father, he had a seven-month absence from work to support his mother in Providence; after returning to New York, he resigned to focus on comedy. After struggling as a stand-up and becoming frustrated with the challenges of making a living at it Mecurio returned to Wall Street investment banking, swearing off comedy and telling himself and his girlfriend that he would leave comedy for good, but after seven months relapsed and again began performing.

Mecurio dropped the "r" from his surname to distinguish himself from Australian actor and dancer Paul Mercurio, who had joined the same entertainment union before him.

The Late Show w/Stephen Colbert and The Daily Show w/Jon Stewart
Paul is an Emmy & Peabody Award winning comedian for his work on "The Daily Show w/Jon Stewart," “The Late Show w/Stephen Colbert,” making recurring appearances as a performer on “The Late Show,” other national shows and his own comedy specials. Mecurio was also a featured as a performer on The Daily Show and in The Daily Show segment, "Second Opinion," in which he skewered the medical profession playing an HMO representative with a less than sympathetic mindset.  Paul also did the audience warm ups for the show's in studio taping.

Stand-up, Acting - Television and Film

Mecurio an accomplished actor, As an actor, Paul can currently be seen opposite Golden Globe Winner, Liev Schreiber in the film, “Chuck,” the story about journeyman boxer, Chuck Wepner, the real-life Rocky Balboa. He can be seen in the upcoming crime drama film “Johnny and Clyde,” starring Megan Fox.

Mecurio appears regularly as a commentator on news and sports outlets including, CNN, MSNBC, “CBS Sunday Morning,” Fox News, HLN and ESPN. 

Mecurio has hosted his own shows for Comedy Central, HBO and CBS as well as his own talk show. He has appeared in his own Comedy Central and Showtime Specials, made several appearances on “The Late Show w/Stephen Colbert,” “The Daily Show,” "The CBS Late, Late Show," HBO, “The Tonight Show,“ “Conan,” ESPN, and Showtime.

Mecurio has made dozens of national television appearances as a recurring contributor on the major broadcast and cable networks including on such shows as the venerable “CBS Sunday Morning,” “CNN New Day,” “CNN Newsroom,” MSNBC, CBS News, NBC News, CBSN, CNBC, ESPN and ESPN +, Fox News, VH-1, “Dr. Drew,” “Katie Couric,” “Outnumbered,” “Kennedy,” “Showbiz Tonight,” “Viewpoint,” “Hannity,” “Fox and Friends,” HLN, “Real Story” and many more.

Mecurio has hosted several shows and pilots for Comedy Central, CBS, HBO and VH-1.

He is also a published essayist: “The New York Times Sunday Magazine.”

Mecurio has also made appearances in the prestigious New York Comedy Festival, The Montreal "Just for Laughs" Festival and the Glasgow/Edinburgh Comedy Festival.

Got No Game w/Paul Mecurio - HBO
Mecurio hosted, created, and was showrunner and executive producer for the HBO  series Got No Game w/Paul Mecurio, a sports comedy show skewering with world of sports on and off the field.

that he co-created, and executive produced and in which he starred.

Sports Central - Comedy Central
Mecurio hosted, co-created, and was showrunner and executive producer television pilot for Comedy Central's Sports Central, a sports comedy news show.

that he co-created, and executive produced and in which he starred.

Paul Mecurio's Permission to Speak - Off Broadway
Mecurio created, executive produced and starred in his hit, unique one-man Broadway show, “Paul Mecurio’s Permission to Speak” which was met with rave reviews and been nominated for the prestigious “Best One-Man Show” Broadway Alliance Award. The show will be returning to Broadway.

Other Media
Mecurio currently hosts the hit, critically acclaimed podcast "Inside Out w/Paul Mecurio” on iTunes, Spotify, iHeart, and Audioboom.

References

External links
 Official Website
 The story of how Paul Mecurio switched careers from corporate law to comedy

American male comedians
21st-century American comedians
Living people
Year of birth missing (living people)
Lawyers from Providence, Rhode Island
Georgetown University Law Center alumni
People associated with Willkie Farr & Gallagher